Li Yihua (born 27 April 1963) is a Chinese diver. She competed in the women's 3 metre springboard event at the 1984 Summer Olympics.

References

1963 births
Living people
Chinese female divers
Olympic divers of China
Divers at the 1984 Summer Olympics
Sportspeople from Hebei
Asian Games medalists in diving
Divers at the 1982 Asian Games
Asian Games gold medalists for China
Medalists at the 1982 Asian Games
20th-century Chinese women